Ranger was a British comic book magazine, with occasional printed stories, published by Fleetway Publications for 40 un-numbered issues between 18 September 1965 and 18 June 1966. The title was then incorporated into Look and Learn from issue 232, dated 25 June 1966.

The title was created by Leonard Matthews but edited by John Sanders, with Ken Roscoe as assistant editor and Colin Parker as art editor.  The sub-editor was Terry Magee.

Content
The content was a mixture of factual articles, photo features and comic strips designed to appeal to boys.

Nowadays it is best remembered as the birthplace of the science fiction strip The Rise and Fall of the Trigan Empire originally drawn by Don Lawrence which ran continuously from issue 1 of Ranger until the final issue of Look and Learn in 1982.

Other notable comic strips published in the magazine
 Rob Riley, drawn by Jesus Blasco (a school story set in Westhaven-on-Sea)
 Dan Dakota, drawn by Arturo Del Castillo (a Western)
 Britons Never Never Never Shall Be Slaves (a comic strip using Asterix artwork from the French magazine Pilote with Asterix renamed Beric and the action moved to Great Britain. In this version (never reprinted), Obelix became the son of Boadicea.
 Treasure Island, drawn by John Millar Watt (based on the novel by Robert Louis Stevenson)
 Space Cadet, drawn by Geoff Campion and written by Mike Butterworth. It tells the adventures of Jason January of the Royal Space Force Academy.
 King Solomon's Mines, drawn by Michael Hubbard (based on the novel by H. Rider Haggard)
 Blood on the Prairie, drawn by Alberto Giolitti (a Western based on the novel by Paul Wellman)
 Moby-Dick, drawn by Franco Caprioli (based on the novel by Herman Melville)
 Allan Quatermain, drawn by Michael Hubbard (based on the novel by H. Rider Haggard)
 Rodney Stone, drawn by Carlos V. Roume (based on the novel by Sir Arthur Conan Doyle)

Text serials

The magazine also published serial stories. Among the most well known titles were Sea Change, reprinting Richard Armstrong's Carnegie Medal-winning novel, and Champion of the Spanish Main, which reprinted a serial by Capt. W. E. Johns from the pages of Modern Boy.

Johns was also represented with a series of articles on pirates reprinted from the book The Biggles Book of Treasure Hunting (1962).

Legacy

In November 2004, most of the content of Ranger was purchased from IPC Media by Look and Learn Magazines Ltd.

External links

 Look and Learn official website
 

Fleetway and IPC Comics titles
Comics magazines published in the United Kingdom
Children's magazines published in the United Kingdom
British boys' story papers
1965 comics debuts
1966 comics endings
Magazines established in 1965
Magazines disestablished in 1966
Defunct British comics